This is an incomplete list of military and other armed confrontations that have occurred within the boundaries of the modern US State of South Dakota since European contact. The region was part of the Viceroyalty of New Spain from 1535 to 1679, New France from 1679 to 1803, and part of the United States of America 1803–present.

The Plains Indian Wars directly affected the region during westward expansion.  The Dakota War of 1862 (also known as the Sioux Uprising) involved eastern Dakota Native Americans, the armed conflicts of this war were fought in Minnesota, their former lands.

Battles

Notes

See also

 History of South Dakota
 Plains Indians Wars

Battles
South Dakota
Battles in South Dakota
History of South Dakota